Tadjemout is a town and commune in Laghouat Province, Algeria. According to the 1998 census it has a population of 20,321.

Situated on the very edge of the Saharan Desert, the closest countries to it are Morocco and Tunisia.

Tadjmout is a town and commune in Laghouat Province, Algeria. According to the 1998 census, it has a population of 20,321.

SP5 and several communities, including most notably : the eyebrow, which is the largest gathering outside the headquarters of the municipal population, and also djkaijika and Hadjeb and grab most of the population and deliberately on agriculture and breeding of all types of livestock such as farm Anumeir Tahir inherited from the colonial era .

References

Populated places in Laghouat Province